This is a list of pilot boats for Delaware, New York, New Jersey, Massachusetts and Pennsylvania. Some pilot boats have the same ship number as they may have been replaced with other boats. Ship numbers were used as a ship identifier.

New York Pilot boats

Boston Pilot boats

New Jersey Pilot boats

Delaware Pilot boats

Pennsylvania Pilot boats

Not identified with sail boat number

See also
 List of schooners
 List of boat types
 List of ship types
 List of sailing boat types
 List of types of naval vessels
 List of clipper ships
 List of sailboat designers and manufacturers
 List of shipbuilders and shipyards

References

External links
 The Sandy Hook Pilots website
 Digital Commonwealth Pilot Boats website

Ship types
Sailboat types

Sea captains
Maritime pilotage
American shipbuilders
U. S. pilot boats